The High Priest of Country Music is the thirty-third studio album by American country music singer Conway Twitty. The album was released in 1975, by MCA Records.

Track listing

Charts

References

1975 albums
Conway Twitty albums
MCA Records albums
Albums produced by Owen Bradley